WMME-FM (92.3 MHz), known as "92 Moose", is a radio station located in Augusta, Maine. The station airs a Top 40 format. The station has an Effective Radiated Power of 50,000 watts, meaning that the station can be heard across much of Central, Western, and Mid-Coast Maine. WMME's transmitter is located on U.S. Route 202, about 6 Miles Northeast of Downtown Augusta. On weekday mornings, the station airs the "Moose Morning Show", a popular morning program in Central Maine. The station is owned by Townsquare Media. On air personalities include Renee Nelson, Cooper Fox, Brittany Rose, Kayla Thomas  and Matt James.

Affiliated stations
WEBB 98.5 "B 98.5" Country music
WJZN/WTVL "Kool AM 1400 and 1490"

References

External links
WMME-FM official website

MME-FM
Contemporary hit radio stations in the United States
Companies based in Augusta, Maine
Radio stations established in 1981
Townsquare Media radio stations
1981 establishments in Maine